The Hyperion is an early portable computer that vied with the Compaq Portable to be the first portable IBM PC compatible. It was marketed by Infotech Cie of Ottawa, a subsidiary of Bytec Management Corp., who acquired the designer and manufacturer Dynalogic in January 1983. In 1984, the design was licensed by Commodore International in a move that was forecast as a "radical shift of position" and a signal that Commodore would soon dominate the PC compatible market. Despite computers being "hand-assembled from kits" provided by Bytec and displayed alongside the Commodore 900 at a German trade show as their forthcoming first portable computer, it was never sold by Commodore and some analysts downplayed the pact. The Hyperion was shipped in January 1983 at C$4995, two months ahead of the Compaq Portable.

Brand name
The name "Hyperion" was invented by Taylor-Sprules Corporation in Toronto. They also designed the retail packaging, all marketing materials and the tradeshow exhibit at Comdex in Atlantic City where Hyperion was first introduced in 1982. Two prototypes were shown. The amber graphics screens, and a built-in modem, were notable features that attracted comment at the show.

Design

The machine featured 256 KB RAM, dual 360 KB 5.25" floppy disk drives, a graphics card compatible with both CGA and HGC, a video-out jack, a built-in 7-inch amber CRT, 300 bit/s modem, and an acoustic coupler.  It included a version of MS-DOS called H-DOS and bundled word processor, database, and modem software.  While the Hyperion weighed just eighteen pounds (8.2 kg), or about 2/3 the weight of the Compaq, it was not as reliable or as IBM compatible and was discontinued within two years.  One significant difference from the IBM system was the use of a Zilog Z80-SIO chip instead of a National Semiconductor 8250 for serial communications.

Interface
H-DOS was remarkable and is of historical significance because it featured a simple menu system. The  through  keys beneath the 7" screen corresponded to five menu items displayed at the bottom of the screen. This menu was context sensitive and greatly facilitated entering DOS commands. All but the least frequently used commands were available as F-key menu selections, and this greatly reduced the amount of typing required. This user interface was comparable to the many DOS shell programs available at the time but functioned much more smoothly because of the soft key concept.

The soft keys were also featured in the word processor, database, and modem software that came bundled with the Hyperion, where they were used to select application commands from context-sensitive menus.

Demise
The initial interest in the Hyperion was high. An order backlog worth  had built up, and plans were made to manufacture most units in the United States. However, incompatibility with the IBM PC was a concern for buyers, since many programs of the time made direct calls to the system ROM, and the video display and serial port used different integrated circuits than the IBM PC. The Dynalogic company was absorbed by Bytec in early 1983. Bytec in turn was merged into Comterm in later 1983. Faulty disk drives created warranty claims for computers built at the Huntsville, Alabama plant.

References

External links
Hyperion info on Old-computers online museum
Hyperion page on Obsolete Technologies website
Dynalogic York University Computer Museum page on Dynalogic and successors

Portable computers
Personal computers
IBM PC compatibles
Computer-related introductions in 1983